The huge moth family Noctuidae contains the following genera:

A B C D E F G H I J K L M N O P Q R S T U V W X Y Z

Habershonia
Habrophyes
Habrostolodes
Habryntis
Hada
Hadena
Hadenella
Hadennia
Haderonia
Haderonidis
Hadjina
Hadula
Hadulipolia
Haemabasis
Haemachola
Haemaphlebia
Haematosticta
Haemerosia
Hakkaria
Halastus
Haliophyle
Halochroa
Hamodes
Hampsonidia
Hampsonodes
Hapalotis
Hapda
Haplocestra
Haploolophus
Haplopseustis
Haplostola
Harita
Haritalopha
Harpaglaea
Harpagophana
Harrisimemna
Harutaeographa
Harveya
Hebdomochondra
Hecatera
Hecatesia
Hedymiges
Helia
Helicoverpa
Heliocheilus
Heliocontia
Heliodes
Heliodora
Heliolonche
Helionycta
Heliophana
Heliophisma
Heliophobus
Helioscota
Heliosea
Heliothis
Heliothodes
Helivictoria
Helotropha
Hemeroblemma
Hemeroplanis
Hemibryomima
Hemicephalis
Hemiceratoides
Hemichloridia
Hemictenophora
Hemieuxoa
Hemiexarnis
Hemigeometra
Hemiglaea
Hemigraphiphora
Hemigrotella
Heminocloa
Hemioslaria
Hemipachnobia
Hemipachycera
Hemipsectra
Hemispragueia
Hemistilbia
Hemituerta
Heoeugorna
Hepatica
Hepsidera
Heptagrotis
Heptapotamia
Heraclia
Heraema
Herchunda
Herminia
Herminiocala
Herminodes
Hermonassa
Hermonassoides
Herpeperas
Herpoperasa
Hespagarista
Hesperimorpha
Hesperochroa
Heteranassa
Heterandra
Heterochroma
Heterocryphia
Heterodelta
Heteroeuxoa
Heterogramma
Heterographa
Heteromala
Heterommiola
Heteropalpia
Heterophysa
Heteropygas
Heterormista
Heterorta
Heteroscotia
Heterospila
Hexamitoptera
Hexaureia
Hexorthodes
Hiaspis
Hiccoda
Hileia
Hillia
Himachalia
Himalistra
Himerois
Hingula
Hipoepa
Hirsutipes
Hirsutopalpis
Hoeneidia
Hollandia
Holocryptis
Holoxanthina
Homaea
Homoanartha
Homocerynea
Homodes
Homodina
Homoglaea
Homohadena
Homolagoa
Homonacna
Homococnemis
Homophoberia
Homopyralis
Homorthodes
Hondryches
Honeyania
Hopetounia
Hoplarista
Hoplodrina
Hoplolythra
Hoplolythrodes
Hoplotarache
Hoplotarsia
Hopothia
Hormisa
Hormoschista
Hortonius
Huebnerius
Hulodes
Hulypegis
Humichola
Hurworthia
Hyada
Hyalobole
Hyamia
Hyboma
Hydraecia
Hydrillodes
Hydrillula
Hydroeciodes
Hyelopsis
Hygrostola
Hygrostolides
Hylonycta
Hymenocryphia
Hymenodrina
Hypaenistis
Hypangitia
Hypanua
Hypena
Hypenagonia
Hypenagoniodes
Hypenarana
Hypendalia
Hypenodes
Hypenomorpha
Hypenopsis
Hypenula
Hyperaucha
Hyperbaniana
Hypercalymnia
Hypercodia
Hyperdasys
Hyperepia
Hyperfrontia
Hyperlopha
Hyperlophoides
Hypermilichia
Hypernaenia
Hypersophtha
Hyperstrotia
Hypersypnoides
Hypertrocon
Hypertrocta
Hypeuthina
Hyphilare
Hypnotype
Hypobarathra
Hypobleta
Hypocala
Hypocalamia
Hypocalpe
Hypocoena
Hypoechana
Hypoglaucitis
Hypogramma
Hypogrammodes
Hypomecia
Hyponeuma
Hypoperigea
Hypopleurona
Hypoplexia
Hypoprora
Hypopteridia
Hypopyra
Hyposada
Hyposemansis
Hyposemeia
Hypospila
Hypostilbia
Hypostrotia
Hyposypnoides
Hypotacha
Hypotrisula
Hypotrix
Hypotuerta
Hypotype
Hypoxestia
Hyppa
Hypsa
Hypsiforma
Hypsophila
Hypsoropha
Hyptioxesta
Hyrcanypena
Hyriodes
Hyssia

References 

 Natural History Museum Lepidoptera genus database

 
Noctuid genera H